James Strachan Barty (1806–1875) was a Scottish minister who served as Moderator of the General Assembly of the Church of Scotland in 1868/9.

Life

Barty was born in the manse at Bendochy in Perthshire near Coupar Angus, the son of Thomas Barty.

In 1829 he replaced his father as minister of Bendochy. In 1844 he took place in a survey regarding the impact of the Poor Laws on his parish.

In 1868 he succeeded Thomas Jackson Crawford as Moderator of the General Assembly. He was replaced in turn by Norman MacLeod (1812-1872) in 1869.

He died in the manse at Bendochy in late January 1875. He had lived in this house for his entire life.

Family

He was married to Margaret Webster.

Their son, James Webster Barty (1841-1915), married Ann Moubray Boyd of Dunblane.

References

1806 births
1875 deaths
People from Perthshire
19th-century Ministers of the Church of Scotland
Moderators of the General Assembly of the Church of Scotland